Khedarmara is a union within Baghaichhari Upazila of Rangamati District in Bangladesh. It contains villages, two high schools, five primary schools, one bazaar and religious institutions.

High schools
 Khedarmara High School
Uluchhari Mouza High School

Primary schools
Khedarmara Government Primary School
Uluchhari Government Primary School
Publakhali Government Primary School
Amtali Government Primary School
Durchhari Government Primary School
Nalbonia Government Primary School

Bazaar
Durchhari Bazar

Villages
Khedarmara
Uttar Publakhali
Uluchhari
Debachhari
Nalbonia
Boro Durchhari
Ranga Durchhari
Moddyam Publakhali
Daxshin Publakhali
Muslim Para

Rangamati Hill District
Unions of Bagaichhari Upazila